Lieutenant General Rudolf Badenhorst (1940 – 2012) was a South African Army general, who served as Chief of Staff Intelligence for the Defence Force. He died in 2012.

Military career
He served as Deputy Chief of the Army from 1 November 1987 In 1989 he was appointed to the Military Intelligence Division as the Chief of Staff Intelligence, a post he held until 1991. Badenhorst left the army at his own request retiring in early 1991 after 30 years of service.

Death
Badenhorst died on 10 November 2012 of pneumonia and heart failure at the George-Mediclinic in George, Western Cape. He had outlived his wife Ina, by less than a month and is survived by four children and eleven grandchildren.

References

South African Army generals
South African military personnel of the Border War
Deaths from pneumonia in South Africa
2012 deaths
1940 births